The Coast View Athletic Association is a high school athletic league that is part of the CIF Southern Section.  It is an amalgamation of the Sea View League and the South Coast Leagues.

Members
Aliso Niguel High School
Capistrano Valley High School	
Dana Hills High School (all sports except football)
El Toro High School
Mission Viejo High School
San Clemente High School
San Juan Hills High School
Tesoro High School
Trabuco Hills High School

References

CIF Southern Section leagues